Samuel Bond may refer to:

 Kit Bond (Christopher Samuel Bond, born 1939), former United States Senator from Missouri
 Samuel Bond (MP) (died 1673), English academic, lawyer and politician